= Twin Sugars =

Mountain in West Virginia, U.S.

Coordinates: 38.0398410°N 80.4378570°W

Twin Sugars is a summit in West Virginia, in the United States. With an elevation of 3,602 feet (1,098 m), Twin Sugars is the 177th highest summit in the state of West Virginia.

Twin Sugars most likely was named for the fact two sugar maple trees stood there.
